Croatia competed at the 2022 World Athletics Championships in Eugene, United States, from 15 to 24 July 2022.

Medallists

Results
Croatia entered 5 athletes.

Men 
Field events

Women 
Field events

References

External links
Oregon22｜WCH 22｜World Athletics

Nations at the 2022 World Athletics Championships
World Championships in Athletics
2022